Kurud Legislative Assembly constituency is one of the 90 Legislative Assembly constituencies of Chhattisgarh state in India.

It is part of Dhamtari district.

Members of the Legislative Assembly

As part of the Madhya Pradesh Legislative Assemly

As part of the Chhattisgarh Legislative Assemly

Election results

Chhattisgarh

2018

Undivided Madhya Pradesh

1957

See also
 List of constituencies of the Chhattisgarh Legislative Assembly
 Dhamtari district

References

Dhamtari district
Assembly constituencies of Chhattisgarh